Warsaw Premiere (Polish:Warszawska premiera) is a 1951 Polish historical film directed by Jan Rybkowski and starring Jan Koecher, Barbara Kostrzewska and Jerzy Duszyński. The film's art direction was by Roman Mann. The film portrays the life of the Polish composer Stanisław Moniuszko, particularly focusing on the composition of his 1848 opera Halka. The film was the first Polish costume film made since the Second World War, and was stylistically similar to historical biopics in other Eastern Bloc countries such as Rimsky-Korsakov (1952).

Cast
 Jan Koecher as Stanisław Moniuszko  
 Barbara Kostrzewska as Paulina Rivoli 
 Jerzy Duszyński as Włodzimierz Wolski 
 Nina Andrycz as Maria Kalergis 
 Ryszard Barycz as Poet  
 Ludwik Benoit as Sculptor 
 Halina Billing-Wohl as Moniuszko (wife)  
 Zenon Burzyński as Tunio  
 Gustaw Buszyński as Theater Director Ignacy Abramowicz  
 Jan Ciecierski as Bishop  
 Tadeusz Cygler as Julian Dobrski  
 Bronisław Darski 
 Wacław Domieniecki as Italian Tenor  
 Aleksander Gąssowski as Jefimow  
 Andrzej Gawroński 
 Jerzy Kaczmarek
 Maria Kaniewska 
 Józef Karbowski as Secretary  
 Emil Karewicz as Georg  
 Krystyna Karkowska as Magdalenka  
 Jan Kurnakowicz as Prof. Jan Quatrini  
 Wiesława Kwaśniewska 
 Henryk Modrzewski as Sennewald 
 Zdzisław Mrożewski as Count Alfred 
 Józef Nowak as Student 
 Kazimierz Opaliński as Theater Records-keeper 
 Lech Ordon as Publisher 
 Bronisław Pawlik as Shopkeeper 
 Mieczysław Pawlikowski as Musician 
 Tadeusz Pluciński as Painter 
 Wacław Ścibor-Rylski as Sacchetti 
 Ludwik Sempoliński as Klimowicz  
 Danuta Szaflarska as Countess Krystyna 
 Zdzisław Szymański as Reporter 
 Tadeusz Teodorczyk as Reporter  
 Janusz Warnecki as Professor  
 Stanisław Żeleński as Józef Sikorski, music critic 
 Janusz Ściwiarski 
 Olga Sawicka
 Teresa Szmigielówna
 Kazimierz Szubert 
 Jan Zieliński
 Czesław Piaskowski
 Jerzy Pietraszkiewicz
 Janina Ordężanka

References

Bibliography
 Liehm, Mira & Liehm, Antonín J. The Most Important Art: Eastern European Film After 1945. University of California Press, 1977.

External links
 
 Warszawska premiera at the www.filmpolski.pl 

1951 films
Polish musical drama films
Polish historical films
Films about classical music and musicians
Films about composers
1950s Polish-language films
1950s musical drama films
1950s historical musical films
Films set in Poland
Films set in Warsaw
Films set in the 19th century
Films directed by Jan Rybkowski
Polish black-and-white films